NS18, NS 18, NS-18, NS.18, or variation, may refer to:

Places
 Braddell MRT station (station code NS18), Toa Payoh, Singapore; a mass transit station
 Preston-Dartmouth (constituency N.S. 18), Nova Scotia, Canada; a provincial electoral district
 Sipaliwini District (FIPS region code NS18), Suriname

Other uses
 SOR NS 18, a low-floor articulated single-level bus from SOR
 Blue Origin NS-18, a suborbital space tourism flight on 2021 October 12 from Blue Origin

See also

 NS (disambiguation)
 18 (disambiguation)

Disambiguation pages